The 1968 Bucknell Bison football team was an American football team that represented Bucknell University during the 1968 NCAA College Division football season. Bucknell placed second in the Middle Atlantic Conference, University Division.

In their fourth and final year under head coach Carroll Huntress, the Bison compiled a 5–5 record. Sam Havrilak was the team captain. 

The Bisons' 3–2 record against MAC University Division opponents was the second-best in the eight-team division. Bucknell was one of only two teams, along with Delaware (5–0) to post a winning record in divisional games.

Bucknell played its home games at Memorial Stadium on the university campus in Lewisburg, Pennsylvania.

Schedule

References

Bucknell
Bucknell Bison football seasons
Bucknell Bison football